Kurthi Jafarpur is a census town in Mau district in the Indian state of Uttar Pradesh.

Demographics

 India census, Kurthi Jafarpur had a population of 11,943. Males constitute 51% of the population and females 49%. Kurthi Jafarpur has an average literacy rate of 56%, lower than the national average of 59.5%: male literacy is 64%, and female literacy is 49%. In Kurthi Jafarpur, 23% of the population is under 6 years of age.

References

Cities and towns in Mau district